Suseni may refer to:

places in Romania:
 Suseni, Argeș
 Suseni, Harghita
 Suseni, Mureș
 Suseni, a village in Bogați Commune, Argeș County
 Suseni, a village in Runcu, Gorj
 Suseni, a village in Râu de Mori Commune, Hunedoara County
 Suseni, a village in Băcani Commune, Vaslui County
 Suseni, a village in Stoenești, Vâlcea County
 Suseni, a district in the town of Zlatna, Alba County
 Suseni, a district in the town of Bolintin-Vale, Giurgiu County
 Suseni (river), a tributary of the Șușița in Gorj County

Other uses:
 Suseni (Kurdish tribe), a tribe in Iran